Dowlatabad Rural District is in the Central District of Abhar County, Zanjan province, Iran. At the National Census of 2006, its population was 4,228 in 937 households. There were 3,225 inhabitants in 898 households at the following census of 2011. At the most recent census of 2016, the population of the rural district was 2,605 in 739 households. The largest of its 16 villages was Chang Almas, with 426 people.

References 

Abhar County

Rural Districts of Zanjan Province

Populated places in Zanjan Province

Populated places in Abhar County